The following highways are numbered 596:

United States

Other places